"G'd Up" is a song by American Gangsta rap group Tha Eastsidaz, featuring vocals from American singer Butch Cassidy. was released on December 7, 1999 as the first single of his self-titled debut album, with the record labels; Doggystyle Records and TVT Records. The song was produced by Battlecat.

Commercial performance 
The song became a moderate crossover hit, peaking at number 47 on the Billboard Hot 100, while finding better success on the Billboard Hot R&B/Hip-Hop Songs chart and Rap Songs chart, peaking at 19 and 2 respectively.

Track listing 
Vinyl
"G'd Up" (Street) - 4:34
"G'd Up" (Clean) - 4:33
"G'd Up" (Instrumental) - 4:32
"G'd Up" (Acapella) - 4:08

CD Single
"G'd Up" (Radio) - 4:33
"G'd Up" (Instrumental) - 4:32

Charts

Weekly charts

Year-end charts

References

1999 singles
TVT Records singles
Gangsta rap songs
1999 songs
Songs written by Snoop Dogg
Songs written by Battlecat (record producer)